Grenville Arthur James Cole FRS, FGS, MRIA (21 October 1859 – 20 April 1924) was an English geologist. He was from 1890 the Professor of Geology and Mineralogy in the Royal College of Science for Ireland, and from 1905 he became the fifth Director of the Geological Survey of Ireland.

Cole was born in London, and was the son of John Jenkins Cole (1815–1897) an architect, and Anna Maria Josephine Smith (c.1832-1903).

He was elected a Fellow of the Royal Society in 1917. He served as President of the Geographical Association 1919–1920, and in 1921 became the president of the Irish Geographical Association.

Cole supported women in their geological studies, including by teaching at Bedford College, London between 1886 and 1890. Mabel Crawford MacDowall was one of Cole's students at the Royal College of Science for Ireland. She married William Bourke Wright, a geologist. She then deployed her talents in the Geological Survey by studying fossils from the Leinster coalfield, and publishing a paper in 1920, under the Directorship of Cole (Herries Davis, 1995). Blanche Vernon was also one of Cole's students. Eventually Cole and Vernon were married, and she produced fine drawings of his thin section petrography, to illustrate his published papers (Wyse Jackson, 1989).

Works

 The Gypsy road; a journey from Krakow to Coblentz (1894) 
 Open-air studies in geology (1902) 
 Aids in practical geology (nd) 5th ed. 1906
 The changeful earth; an introduction to the record of the rocks (1911) 
 Outlines of mineralogy for geological students (1913) 
 The growth of Europe (1914) 
 Ireland, the outpost (1919) 
 General guide to the natural history collections : description of the raised map of Ireland (1920) 
 Rocks and Their Origins (1924)
 Common Stones – unconventional essays in geology (not dated, 1921 ?)

References

Herries Davis, G. L. (1995) North from the Hook: 150 years of the Geological Survey of Ireland. Geological Survey of Ireland, Dublin. 
Wyse Jackson, P.N. (1989) On rocks and bicycles: a bibliography of Grenville Arthur James Cole (1859–1924) fifth Director of the Geological Survey of Ireland. Geological Survey of Ireland Bulletin 4 151–163.

External links
 
 
 

1859 births
1924 deaths
Fellows of the Royal Society